The term Big Six law firms referred, prior to 2012, to the six largest - by lawyer head count - Australian law firms. In 2012, four merged or formed association relationships with firms from other countries (the United Kingdom for three of them, China for one of them).

Since the 2012 changes, and due to the expansion of other competing law firms, the Australian legal landscape is increasingly characterised by the concept of top tier law firms. The top tier law firms are Allens, Ashurst, Clayton Utz, Corrs Chambers Westgarth, Gilbert + Tobin, Herbert Smith Freehills, King & Wood Mallesons, and MinterEllison.

Big Six firms
Prior to 2012, the following firms were generally seen as composing the Big Six (listed alphabetically):
 Allens Arthur Robinson (now Allens, which operates in association with Linklaters LLP)
 Blake Dawson (now Ashurst Australia, part of British-based multinational firm Ashurst LLP)
 Clayton Utz
 Freehills (now part of Herbert Smith Freehills)
 Mallesons Stephen Jaques (now part of King & Wood Mallesons)
 MinterEllison

In 2012, three of these firms merged with overseas firms, and one other began operating in association with an overseas firm. 

Following these major changes in the Australian legal scene, the "Big Six" term is less used, and "top-tier law firms" is now the descriptor more favoured for the largest, most profitable, law firms in Australia.

Historical size and rankings
The majority of the six firms were among the 100 largest law firms globally. In terms of revenue these were:

Several of these predecessor firms have also been leading firms in the Asia-Pacific region generally. In 2007, Allens Arthur Robinson, Clayton Utz, Freehills, and Mallesons Stephen Jaques were the top five firms in the Asia Pacific region in mergers and acquisitions transactions, ranking above Magic Circle firm Linklaters.

The Business Review Weekly (BRW) listed these firms in its "Top 500 Private Companies" tables based on gross income:	 	
In the 2011−2012 Australian financial year, the law firms with the highest revenue were as follows:
	

Until its closure, BRW awarded its Client Choice Awards in the "Best law firm, revenue over $200 million" category to a law firm judged to deliver the best client service. In 2012 that firm was King & Wood Mallesons. 
 	
The Australian Financial Review took over as the media partner for the Client Choice Awards after it acquired BRW.

In 2013 the finalists for the award were (listed alphabetically):
		
 Ashurst Australia
 Herbert Smith Freehills
 King & Wood Mallesons
 Norton Rose

Developments in Australian legal landscape
From 1 March 2012, Blake Dawson traded as Ashurst Australia until a full financial merger with Ashurst LLP on 1 November 2013; the full merger took place six months ahead of schedule.

Mallesons Stephen Jaques trades as King & Wood Mallesons, after a merger and reorganisation with Chinese firm King & Wood, which has resulted in a Swiss association-structured association among what was the Australian and United Kingdom practice of Mallesons Stephen Jaques, a fully merged, combined Hong Kong practice, and a fully merged, combined mainland China practice consisting mainly of the existing King & Wood practice. In 2013, King & Wood Mallesons further merged with London-headquartered Silver Circle law firm SJ Berwin, although that practice ceased operations in 2017.

Allens Arthur Robinson changed its name to Allens on 1 May 2012, and began to operate in association with the Magic Circle firm Linklaters. The association arrangements will see the firms operate with joint ventures in some parts of Asia, Allens practices merging into Linklaters practices in other parts, and the two firms operating jointly on certain matters.

Freehills merged with London-headquartered Silver Circle law firm Herbert Smith, effective from 1 October 2012. The full financial merger created a single, global firm called Herbert Smith Freehills.

Top tier law firms in Australia
, the top tier law firms in Australia are (listed alphabetically):
Allens
Ashurst
Clayton Utz
Corrs Chambers Westgarth
Gilbert + Tobin
Herbert Smith Freehills
King & Wood Mallesons 
MinterEllison

Similar terms in the UK
The Magic Circle is an informal term for UK-headquartered law firms with the largest revenues, the most international work and which consistently outperform the rest of the UK market on profitability. The Silver Circle is an informal term for perceived elite corporate law firms headquartered in the United Kingdom that are the main competitors for the magic circle.

The London-headquartered Magic Circle firms with operations in Australia, Clifford Chance and Allen & Overy, are not considered to be part of the same group as the Australian top tier law firms.

Following the mergers and association arrangements announced in 2012 and 2013, Freehills and Blake Dawson have become parts of UK-headquartered Silver Circle firms, while Allens is now in an association arrangement with a Magic Circle law firm.

See also
 Big Five law firms, informal term for South Africa's prominent law firms
 Big Four law firms, informal term for leading law firms in Japan
 Red Circle, term for major law firms in China, coined in 2014 by The Lawyer magazine
 Seven Sisters, informal term for leading law firms in Canada
 White-shoe firm, informal term for major professional services firms, including law firms

References